SPT20 homolog is a protein that in humans is encoded by the SUPT20H gene.

References

Further reading

External links